The Siebe Gorman Savox was an industrial and mines rescue oxygen rebreather breathing set with a use duration of 45 minutes. It was worn in front of the body. It had no hard casing.

External links
http://www.healeyhero.co.uk/rescue/glossary/aerorlox.htm

Rebreathers